The Deathship Has a New Captain (subtitled 9 Songs of Death, Doom and Horror) is the debut studio album by German gothic metal band The Vision Bleak, released on 23 February 2004 through Prophecy Productions. The album counts with a guest appearance by Dame Pandora of Dark Sanctuary fame providing additional vocals.

Track listing

Trivia
 "The Night of the Living Dead" references George A. Romero's 1968 film of the same name.
 "Wolfmoon" references the classic 1941 film The Wolf Man.
 "Metropolis" is a reference to Fritz Lang's German Expressionist 1927 film of the same name.
 "Elizabeth Dane" is the name of the clipper which plays a prominent role on John Carpenter's 1980 film The Fog.
 "Horror of Antarctica" references in its lyrics H. P. Lovecraft's 1931 novella At the Mountains of Madness.
 The album's title itself references Alvin Rakoff's 1980 film Death Ship.

Personnel

The Vision Bleak
 Ulf Theodor Schwadorf (Markus Stock) – vocals, guitars, bass, keyboards
 Allen B. Konstanz (Tobias Schönemann) – vocals, drums, keyboards

Guest musicians
 Otto Mellies – narrations
 Thomas Helm – additional tenor vocals
 Nadine Stock – woodwinds
 Dame Pandora – additional soprano vocals

Miscellaneous staff
 Martin Koller – production

External links
 The Vision Bleak's official website

The Vision Bleak albums
2004 debut albums